Keezhur  is a village in Kannur district in the Indian state of Kerala near Iritty. Keezhur Mahadeva and Mahavishnu Temples are in this village. It is a part of Iritty municipality. Bavali river flows through Keezhur.

Demographics
 India census, Keezhur had a population of 15,979 with 7,875 males and 8,104 females.

Educational institutions
 Mahatma Gandhi College, Keezhur Kunnu was founded by Iritty Educational Society and is affiliated to the Kannur University. Initially the college was affiliated to University of Calicut.
 VUPS - The school where students of this village get their primary education.
 Iritty Higher secondary School - Over 50 years of service from standard 5th till 12th

Vivekananda Samskarika Kendram
This is acting as a cultural centre of Keezhur. Thousands of people in this region are readers of the library.

Keezhur Sree Mahadeva Temple
This temple is on the banks of Bavali river, where thousands of people offer their prayers to Lord Shiva.  The eight-day long festival in the month of Meenam and Shivaratri are the main festivals of this temple.

Transportation
The national highway passes through Kannur town.  Mangalore and Mumbai can be accessed on the northern side and Cochin and Thiruvananthapuram can be accessed on the southern side.  The road to the east of Iritty connects to Mysore and Bangalore.   The nearest railway station is Kannur on Mangalore-Palakkad line. There are airports at Mangalore and Calicut.

References

Villages near Iritty